Phlebobranchia is a suborder of sea squirts in the class Ascidiacea, first described by Fernando Lahille in 1886.

Characteristics 

The group includes both colonial and solitary animals. They are distinguished from other sea squirts by the presence of longitudinal vessels in the pharyngeal basket. This provides the etymology of their name: in ancient greek,  means "blood vessel". Another characteristic of phlebobranchians is the gonads being surrounded by a loop of gut. The posterior part of the abdomen is absent, and many species also lack the epicardial cavity that surrounds the heart and other internal organs in many other sea squirts.

Taxonomy
 ?†Permosomidae
 ?†Permosoma tunicatum Jaekel 1915 [Sphaerospongia permotessellata Parona 1933]
 Agneziidae Monniot & Monniot 1991 [Agnesiidae Michaelsen 1898]
Adagnesia Kott 1963
Agnezia Monniot & Monniot 1991 [Agnesia Michaelsen 1898 non Koninck 1883]
Caenagnesia Ärnbäck-Christie-Linde 1938
Proagnesia depressa (Millar 1955)
Pterygascidia Sluiter 1904 [Ciallusia Van Name 1918]
 Diazonidae Garstang 1891
Diazona Savigny 1816 [Aphanibranchion Oka 1906; Syntethys Forbes & Goodsir 1851; Diagonum Troschel 1842; Diagoma Wade 1842]
 Pseudodiazona Millar 1963 [Patridium Kott 1975]
 Pseudorhopalaea solitaris Millar 1975
 Rhopalaea Philippi 1843 [Rhopalona Roule 1886; Rhopalopsis Herdman 1890]
 Syndiazona chinensis Tokioka 1955 [Syndiazona Oka 1926]
 Tylobranchion Herdman 1886
 Dimeatidae Sanamyan 2001
 Dimeatus Monniot & Monniot 1982
 Hypobythiidae
Hypobythius Moseley 1879
 Octacnemidae
 Benthascidia michaelseni Ritter 1907
 Cibacapsa gulosa Monniot & Monniot 1983
 Cryptia planum Monniot & Monniot 1985
 Dicopia Sluiter 1905
 Kaikoja Monniot 1998
 Megalodicopia Oka 1918
 Myopegma Monniot & Monniot 2003
 Octacnemus Moseley 1877
 Polyoctacnemus patagoniensis (Metcalf 1893) Ihle
 Situla Vinogradova 1969
 Plurellidae Kott 1973
 Microgastra granosa (Sluiter 1904)
 Plurella Kott 1973
 Cionidae Lahille 1887 [incl. Pseudodiazona]
Araneum Monniot & Monniot 1973
 Ciona Fleming 1822
 Tantillulum molle Monniot & Monniot 1984
 Corellidae Lahille 1888 [Rhodosomatidae Hartmeyer 1908]
Abyssascidia Herdman 1880
Chelyosoma Broderip & Sowerby 1830
Clatripes flaccidus Monniot & Monniot 1976
Corella Alder & Hancock 1870
Corelloides molle Oka 1926
Corellopsis Hartmeyer 1903
Corynascidia Herdman 1882 [Agnesiopsis Monniot 1969]
Dextrogaster suecica Monniot 1962
Mysterascidia symmetrica Monniot & Monniot 1984
Rhodosoma Ehrenberg 1828 [Chevreulius Lacaze-Duthiers 1865; Corellascidia Hartmeyer 1900; Peroides Macdonald 1864; Schizascus Stimpson 1855]
Xenobranchion Ärnbäck-Christie-Linde 1950
 Perophoridae Giard 1872
Ecteinascidia Herdman 1880 [Perophoropsis Lahille 1890; Sluiteria]
 Perophora Wiegmann 1835 [Tibiania]
 Ascidiidae Herdman 1882 [incl. Namiella Monniot & Monniot 1968]
Ascidia Linnaeus 1767 [Ascidie Linnaeus 1767; Ascidiopsis Verrill 1872; Bathyascidia Hartmeyer 1901; Phallusioides Huntsman 1912; Tunica; Herdmania Hartmeyer 1900 non Lahille 1888 non Thompson 1893;]
Ascidiella Roule 1884
Fimbrora calsubia Monniot & Monniot 1991 [Fimbrosa Monniot & Monniot 1991]
Phallusia Savigny 1816 [Pachychlaena Hedman 1880; Phallusiopsis Hartmeyer 1908; Plurascidia Monniot & Monniot 2000]
Psammascidia teissieri Monniot 1962

References

External links

Enterogona
Chordate suborders
Taxa named by Fernando Lahille